Laws of Deception is an erotic suspense thriller film produced in 1997. Written by Rollin Jarrett and directed by Joey Travolta, it stars C. Thomas Howell, James Russo, Amber Smith, Nick Mancuso and Brian Austin Green.

Plot synopsis
The plot involves a young man, Evan Marino, who witnessed the murder of his mob-connected parents when he was a child. Evan (C. Thomas Howell) has grown up to become a top law student and justice has become his religion. He has but one goal, which is to become the number one criminal lawyer in Miami. A beautiful and mysterious woman (Amber Smith) enters Evan's life and unbeknownst to him, has been hired by his parents’ murderer (James Russo) to uncover what he remembers. As the truth about his past is revealed, Evan finds himself caught in a tangled web of lies and twisted motivations, not the least of which are his own. Evan eventually discovers that his best friend Cal sleeps with his former lover after school. It turns out that Elise Talbot was hired by Gino Carlucci to watch Evan. She later marries Gino. Gino Carlucci is killed and Elise is the prime suspect. She proclaims her innocence and implicates Cal who becomes an alcoholic because of his past relationship with Elise. Cal commits suicide and Evan becomes convinced the Elise committed that murder so he no longer represents her in the case. As she is found guilty, the final twist reveals that Evan killed Gino Carlucci as revenge for killing his parents.
The film features a brief cameo by famed director John Landis as a crooked judge.

Cast

References 
http://www.amazon.com/Laws-of-Deception/dp/B000NS1GG6

External links 

tv.nytimes.com/show/53098/Laws-of-Deception/overview
https://web.archive.org/web/20110714122623/http://www.movieretriever.com/movies/1674332/Laws-of-Deception

American erotic thriller films
1990s erotic thriller films
1990s English-language films